Tesseropora rosea, the rose barnacle is a species of barnacle found in eastern and southern Australia, and South Africa.

The hard exterior is grey to whitish with four shell plates. Larger specimens show a pinkish colour. Size is 20 millimetres across to 12 millimetres tall. The habitat is exposed rocky shores, from high tide levels to a depth of 58 metres. The diet is plankton and small particles. This barnacle can tolerate strong wave activity.

References

Barnacles
Crustaceans described in 1848